Events from the year 1850 in art.

Events
Controversial exhibition of Pre-Raphaelite paintings by Holman Hunt and Millais at the Royal Academy, Millais' Christ in the House of His Parents being attacked for its ultra-realism. James Collinson resigns from the Pre-Raphaelite Brotherhood, which then dissolves.
Francisco Goya's engravings, Proverbios, are posthumously published.
Edouard Pingret relocates to Mexico City.

Awards
 Grand Prix de Rome, painting:  William-Adolphe Bouguereau, Paul Baudry.
 Grand Prix de Rome, sculpture:
 Grand Prix de Rome, architecture:
 Grand Prix de Rome, music: J.A. Charlot.

Works

Ivan Aivazovsky – The Ninth Wave
Oswald Achenbach – Evening in the Campagna
Hendrik van de Sande Bakhuyzen – The Artist Painting a Cow in a Meadow Landscape
Théodore Chassériau – Othello and Desdemona in Venice
Charles Allston Collins – Berengaria's Alarm
James Collinson
Answering the Emigrant's Letter
The Renunciation of St. Elizabeth of Hungary
Jean-Baptiste-Camille Corot – Une Matinée
Gustave Courbet
A Burial At Ornans
The Stone Breakers
Hippolyte Delaroche – Bonaparte Crossing the Alps
William Maw Egley – Prospero and Miranda (approximate date)
Emmanuel Frémiet
Wounded Bear
Wounded Dog
Horatio Greenough – The Rescue (statue)
Francesco Hayez
The Meditation (first version)
Susanna at her Bath
John Rogers Herbert
Children of the Painter
Cordelia Disinherited (oil on canvas, Harris Museum, Preston, Lancashire)
Lear Disinheriting Cordelia (fresco in Poets' Hall, Palace of Westminster)
William Holman Hunt – A Converted British Family Sheltering a Christian Missionary from the Persecution of the Druids
Daniel Huntington – Feckenham in the Tower
Jan August Hendrik Leys – Divine Service in Holland
Adolph von Menzel – Round Table at Sansouci
John Everett Millais
Christ in the House of His Parents
Ferdinand Lured by Ariel
Jean-François Millet – The Sower (Museum of Fine Arts, Boston)
Dante Gabriel Rossetti – Ecce Ancilla Domini
Ludwig von Schwanthaler (posthumous) – Bavaria statue
Carl Spitzweg – The Bookworm
George Frederic Watts – Found Drowned (approximate date)

Births
 January 1 – Per Hasselberg, Swedish sculptor (died 1894)
 January 5 – Theodoor Verstraete, Belgian rural realist painter and printmaker (died 1907)
 January 27 – John Collier, English Pre-Raphaelite painter (died 1934)
 February 27 – Henry E. Huntington, American art collector (died 1927)
 March 9 – Sir Hamo Thornycroft, English sculptor (died 1925)
 April 19 – Edward John Gregory, English painter (died 1909)
 April 20
 Daniel Chester French, American sculptor (died 1931)
 Jean-François Raffaëlli, French realist painter (died 1924)
 April 26 – Harry Bates, English sculptor (died 1899)
 May 8 – José Ferraz de Almeida Júnior, Brazilian painter (died 1899)
 July 7 – Max Schmalzl, Bavarian religious painter and illustrator (died 1930)
 September 29 – George Hitchcock, American-born painter en plein air (died 1913)
 November 22 – Georg Dehio, Estonian-born German art historian (died 1932)
 September 23 – Alfred Boucher, French sculptor (died 1934)
 November 28 – Robert Koehler, German-born American painter (died 1917)
 December 25 – Florence Griswold, American curator (died 1937)
 December 31 – John Wycliffe Lowes Forster, Canadian portrait painter (died 1938)

Death
January 16 – Daniel Caffé, German pastel painter of portraits (born 1750)
January 20 – Lorenzo Bartolini, Italian sculptor (born 1777)
January 22 – William Westall, English landscape painter (born 1781)
January 27 – Johann Gottfried Schadow, sculptor (born 1764)
February 23 – Sir William Allan, historical painter (born 1782)
April 11 – Jean Augustin Daiwaille, Dutch portrait painter (born 1786)
April 15 – Jules Robert Auguste, French Impressionist painter (born 1789)
April 16 – Madame Marie Tussaud, French-born modeller of waxworks (born 1761)
May – Richard James Wyatt, sculptor (born 1795)
July 22 – Vicente López y Portaña, Spanish portrait painter (born 1772)
August 13 – Sir Martin Archer Shee, Irish-born portrait painter (born 1769)
August 27 – Henry Room, English portrait painter (born 1802)
October 2 – Sarah Biffen, disabled English painter (born 1784)
November 10 – Alexandre-Évariste Fragonard, French painter and sculptor in the troubadour style (born 1780)
December 8 – Anatole Devosge, French painter (born 1770)
date unknown
Jean Broc, painter (born 1771)
Francis Hervé, painter (born 1781)
François Mulard, Neoclassical French painter (born 1769)
Fei Danxu, Chinese painter in the Qing dynasty (born 1801)

References

 
1850s in art